"Mad Girl's Love Song"  is a poem written by Sylvia Plath in villanelle form that was published in 1953, ten years before her death by suicide. She wrote this poem while attending Smith College and described it as being one of her favorite poems that she had written. "Mad Girl's Love Song" was originally published in the August 1953 issue of Mademoiselle, a New York based magazine geared toward young women. This poem was first formally published during the same month as her first suicide attempt.

Form 
The poem is written in the villanelle or villanesque form of poetry, which contains nineteen lines. These lines consist of five tercets and a quatrain at the end. Two lines of the opening tercet, the first and the third, are known as refrains and are repeated alternately throughout the poem as the final lines of the following tercets. In this poem, the refrains are the lines "I think I made you up inside my head" and "I shut my eyes and all the world drops dead". Villanelle poems have an intricate rhyme scheme of ABA ABA ABA ABA ABA ABAA using only two different sounds.

Themes and symbolism 
"Mad Girl's Love Song" portrays a young woman who has lost a love that was very significant to her. While dealing with this loss, the narrator is having a struggle with her own mind questioning if this lover was real or if she made them up inside of her head. This confusion about the narrator's own sanity is significant since it is widely known that Plath herself struggled greatly with mental health and this poem was written only a couple of months before her first attempted suicide in 1953. This is a confessional poem in which Plath unashamedly writes about a narrator with themes of depression and even schizophrenia.

The poem uses religious figures and symbols, including God, Satan and his men, Seraphim, and Hell. In this poem, the religious figures and symbols that she uses are ultimately destroyed, symbolizing her mental state deteriorating because of the loss of her love that was so vital to her.

Plath uses personification in "Mad Girl's Love Song" giving the stars in the ability to 'waltz' and darkness the ability to 'gallop'. She also uses many allusions in this poem. In the fourth stanza of "Mad Girl's Love Song" readers can see religious allusions referring to "God toppling from the sky" and "Hell's fires fading" that signal to the reader that the narrator's belief in religion is crumbling around her because of the loss of her vital lover. The references to 'Seraphim' and 'Satan's men' also continue these religious allusions.

Religion 

"Mad Girl's Love Song" has some religious references that ended up being mostly destroyed in the last few stanzas; Plath believed that traditional religion was mostly useless to women, as it normally only had the interests and values of men in mind. Years after the publication of Mad Girl's Love Song" she wrote a feminist critique of the Christian religion in which she states that the concept of the holy Trinity is completely made up by men for men. These ideas about religion and feminism that she had can explain the symbols of religion in "Mad Girl's Love Song" being deteriorated by the narrator after losing her lover.

References 

American poems
1953 poems
Love poems
Works originally published in Mademoiselle (magazine)
Poetry by Sylvia Plath